In enzymology, a biotin—[acetyl-CoA-carboxylase] ligase is an enzyme that catalyzes the chemical reaction

ATP + biotin + apo-[acetyl-CoA:carbon-dioxide ligase (ADP-forming)]  AMP + diphosphate + [acetyl-CoA:carbon-dioxide ligase (ADP-forming)]

The 3 substrates of this enzyme are ATP, biotin, and apo-[acetyl-CoA:carbon-dioxide ligase (ADP-forming)], whereas its 3 products are AMP, diphosphate, and acetyl-CoA:carbon-dioxide ligase (ADP-forming).

This enzyme belongs to the family of ligases, specifically those forming generic carbon-nitrogen bonds.

This enzyme participates in biotin metabolism.  This protein may use the morpheein model of allosteric regulation.

Nomenclature 

The systematic name of this enzyme class is biotin:apo-[acetyl-CoA:carbon-dioxide ligase (ADP-forming)] ligase (AMP-forming). Other names in common use include:
 biotin-[acetyl-CoA carboxylase] synthetase,
 biotin-[acetyl coenzyme A carboxylase] synthetase,
 acetyl coenzyme A holocarboxylase synthetase,
 acetyl CoA holocarboxylase synthetase,
 biotin:apocarboxylase ligase,
 biotin holoenzyme synthetase,
 and HCS.

References

Further reading 

 

EC 6.3.4
Enzymes of known structure